The 2022 season is IFK Göteborg's 117th in existence, their 90th season in Allsvenskan and their 46th consecutive season in the league. They compete in Allsvenskan and Svenska Cupen. League play started on 3 April and will end on 6 November.

Players

Squad information

Club

Coaching staff

Other information

Competitions

Overall

Allsvenskan

League table

Results summary

Results by round

Matches
Kickoff times are in UTC+2 unless stated otherwise.

Svenska Cupen

2021–22
The tournament continued from the 2021 season.

Kickoff times are in UTC+1.

Group stage

Knockout stage

2022–23
The tournament continues into the 2023 season.

Qualification stage

Non competitive

Pre-season
Kickoff times are in UTC+1.

Mid-season
Kickoff times are in UTC+2.

References

IFK Göteborg seasons
IFK Goteborg